is a Japanese multimedia spin-off series of Bandai Namco Entertainment's The Idolmaster franchise, which started as a browser game that launched in April 2018. A manga adaptation was serialized on Kadokawa Shoten's Comic Newtype website from July 2019 to August 2022. An anime television series adaptation by Polygon Pictures is set to premiere in Q2 2024.

Development and release
The browser game, which uses HTML5, was announced during a presentation in February 2018. It launched on the browser game platform Enza on April 24, 2018, reaching over 800,000 pre-registrations ahead of its release. A mobile app version was released on iOS and Android on March 13, 2019.

Related media

Radio show
The Idolmaster Shiny Colors: Habataki Radio Station, an Internet radio show featuring voice actors from the game, premiered on Bandai Namco's  service on June 14, 2018. Bonus content, titled Habataki After Radio Station (originally Kyūkeishitsu), are released for premium members of the service.

Manga
A four-panel manga series by Gimmy began serialization on the game's website and Twitter account in February 2018. It is published in print under the title The Idolmaster Shiny Colors: Shinymas Everyday!.

A manga adaptation by Akira Shinozaki was serialized on Kadokawa Shoten's Comic Newtype website from July 23, 2019, to August 26, 2022. It has been collected into five tankōbon volumes, published from March 2020 to December 2022.

Anime
An anime television series adaptation was announced on March 19, 2023. It is produced by Polygon Pictures and directed by Mankyū, with Yoichi Kato writing the scripts, and Takeshi Iwata serving as assistant director, as well as CG director along with Susumu Sugai. Ryōhei Fukushi is designing the characters for animation, and Lantis is composing the music. The 12-episode series will be screened in Japan in three parts starting on October 27, 2023, before premiering on television in Q2 2024.

References

External links
  
  

2018 video games
Anime television series based on video games
Bandai Namco games
Browser games
Japanese idols in anime and manga
Japanese webcomics
Kadokawa Shoten manga
Music in anime and manga
Polygon Pictures
Seinen manga
Shiny Colors
Upcoming anime television series
Webcomics in print
Yonkoma